Georgina "Gina" McKee is an English actress. She won the 1997 BAFTA TV Award for Best Actress for Our Friends in the North (1996), and earned subsequent nominations for  The Lost Prince (2003) and The Street (2007). She also starred on television in The Forsyte Saga (2002) and as Caterina Sforza in The Borgias (2011). Her film appearances include Notting Hill (1999),  Phantom Thread (2017), and My Policeman (2022).

Early life
McKee was born in Peterlee, County Durham, the daughter of a coal miner, and grew up there and in nearby Easington and Sunderland. Her first experience of acting occurred in her final year at primary school where her teacher finished the school week off with improvisations. Seeing a poster in a shoe-shop window for a new youth drama group, McKee and her friends decided to attend, initially not seriously but later becoming enthusiastic. It led to McKee's first professional appearance, working on Tyne Tees children's series, Quest of Eagles.

From the age of 15, McKee spent three summers in London with the National Youth Theatre. After completing her A-Levels at East Durham College, she decided, with her parents' blessing, to apply to drama schools rather than art colleges. However, she was rejected by Bristol Old Vic Theatre School, London Academy of Music and Dramatic Art and the Central School of Speech and Drama.

Career
McKee began her career in TV with several background roles including a part on The Lenny Henry Show. She made her film debut in 1988 when she had a small role in The Lair of the White Worm. In 1996, she played Mary in the BBC drama Our Friends in the North, a role for which she won three Best Actress awards in 1997: the British Academy Television Award, the Royal Television Society Award and the Broadcasting Press Guild Award. McKee appeared in several episodes of the Chris Morris spoof current affairs show, Brass Eye (1997, 2001), as reporter Libby Shuss.

McKee's theatre credits include Harold Pinter's The Lover and The Collection at the Comedy Theatre in London. In 2008, she appeared in the BBC drama Fiona's Story and a West End revival of Chekhov's Ivanov. In 2010, she appeared as Goneril in the Donmar Warehouse revival of King Lear, directed by Michael Grandage and starring Derek Jacobi. She received an Olivier Award nomination for Best Supporting Actress for her performance. 

She played the mother of a deaf teenager in BBC TV's thriller, The Silence, opposite Genevieve Barr. In 2018, she appeared in the highly successful BBC/Netflix drama series Bodyguard as Commander Anne Sampson.

Personal life
McKee has been married to Kez Cary since 1989; they live in East Sussex, England. She has been a vegetarian since 1982.

In 2002, McKee was awarded an Honorary Doctorate of Arts from the University of Sunderland.

Filmography

Film

Television

Theatre 
King Lear ... Goneril; Donmar Warehouse, London (director: Michael Grandage)
Ivanov ... Anna Petrovna; Donmar Warehouse, London (director: Michael Grandage)
The Lover and the Collection ... Comedy Theatre, London (director: Jamie Lloyd)
The Exonerated ... Sunny Jacobs; Riverside Studios, London (director: Bob Balaban)
Aristocrats ... Judith; National Theatre, London (director: Tom Cairns)
Old TImes ... Kate; Donmar Warehouse, London (director: Roger Michell)
Five Kinds of Silence ... Lyric Hammersmith, London (director: Ian Brown)
Uganda ... National Theatre (Studio), London (director: Polly Teale )
Hammett’s Apprentice ... Royal Court Theatre (Upstairs), London (director: James McDonald)
Fighting for the Dunghill ... Warehouse Theatre, Croydon (director: Richard Osborne)
Separate Tables ... Chichester Festival Theatre, Chichester (director: Philip Franks)
Boudicca ... Shakespeare's Globe, London

References

External links

Gina McKee Biography FilmReference.com

Best Actress BAFTA Award (television) winners
English film actresses
English television actresses
English stage actresses
English radio actresses
Living people
People from Peterlee
People from Sunderland
Actresses from Tyne and Wear
People from Crouch End
National Youth Theatre members
Actors from County Durham
20th-century English actresses
21st-century English actresses
English child actresses
Year of birth missing (living people)